M. J. Nolan (born 25 January 1951) is a former Irish Fianna Fáil politician who served as a Teachta Dála (TD) for the Carlow–Kilkenny constituency from 1982 to 1997 and 2002 to 2011. He also served as a Senator from May 1982 to November 1982 and 2001 to 2002.

Nolan was born in Waterford in 1951, but is a native of Muine Bheag, County Carlow. He was educated at De La Salle school in Muine Bheag and at Mount St. Joseph's in Roscrea, County Tipperary. He first held political office in 1973, when he became a member of Muine Bheag Town Council, a position which he held until 1985. He also served on Carlow County Council from 1979 until 2003, and in May 1982 he was nominated by the Taoiseach, Charles Haughey, to the 16th Seanad.

Nolan, a son of the former cabinet minister Tom Nolan, was first elected as a Fianna Fáil TD for the Carlow–Kilkenny constituency at the November 1982 general election. In 1991, he was one of a "gang of four" (including Noel Dempsey, Liam Fitzgerald and Seán Power) who tabled a motion of no confidence against Taoiseach Charles Haughey as party leader. Nolan lost his seat at the 1997 general election to constituency colleague John J. McGuinness. However, he was elected to the 21st Seanad as a Senator for the Agricultural Panel at a by-election in December 2001.

He regained his Dáil seat at the 2002 general election, and was re-elected in 2007.

He is married to Mary Forde. Together the couple have two sons and two daughters.

He retired from politics at the 2011 general election.

See also
Families in the Oireachtas

References

1951 births
Living people
Local councillors in County Carlow
Fianna Fáil TDs
Members of the 16th Seanad
Members of the 24th Dáil
Members of the 25th Dáil
Members of the 26th Dáil
Members of the 27th Dáil
Members of the 21st Seanad
Members of the 29th Dáil
Members of the 30th Dáil
Politicians from County Carlow
Nominated members of Seanad Éireann
Fianna Fáil senators